Milk Street may refer to:
Milk Street, London
Milk Street, Boston
Milk Street (MBTA station), now State station

See also
Christopher Kimball's Milk Street